This is a list of notable footballers who have played for Halifax Town. The aim is for this list to include all players that have played 100 or more senior matches for the club. Other players who are deemed to have played an important role for the club can be included, but the reason for their notability should be included in the 'Notes' column.

For a list of all Halifax Town players with a Wikipedia article, see :Category:Halifax Town A.F.C. players.

Explanation of List

Players should be listed in chronological order according to the year in which they first played for the club, and then by alphabetical order of their surname. Appearances and goals should include substitute appearances, but exclude wartime matches. Further information on competitions/seasons which are regarded as eligible for appearance stats are provided below, and if any data is not available for any of these competitions an appropriate note should be added to the table.

League appearances
League appearances and goals should include data for the following league spells, but should not include play-off matches: 
 Midland League: 1912-13 to 1920-21 
 Football League: 1921-22 to 1992-93; 1998-99 to 2001-02
 Football Conference: 1993-94 to 1997-98; 2002–03 to 2007–08

Total appearances
The figures for total appearances and goals should include the League figures together with the following competitions:
 Play-off matches (2005–06)
 FA Cup; FA Trophy (1993-94 to 1997-98; 2002–03 to 2007–08)
 Football League Cup, Football League Trophy (including three seasons as a Conference club in 2002–03, 2003–04 and 2005–06); Football League Third Division North Cup (1933-34 to 1937-38)
 Conference League Cup (1993-94 to 1997-98; 2004–05, 2007–08); Football League Group Cup (1982–83); Watney Cup (1971–72)

List of players

Please help to expand this list

Notes

References 
 Post-war Football League Player statistics
 Soccerbase stats (use Search for...on left menu and select 'Players' drop down)
 

Players
 
Halifax Town
Association football player non-biographical articles